Bank of Gowanda is a historic bank building located at Gowanda in Cattaraugus County, New York. It was built in 1914, to the designs of Edvard Moeller.  It is a two-story, five-sided Neoclassical style building constructed of load bearing concrete masonry and clad in red brick. The interior features a mural by noted artist Louis Grell.  Since 1966, the structure has served as town hall for the town of Persia, New York.

It was listed on the National Register of Historic Places in 2001.

References

External links
Bank of Gowanda (AKA: Persia Town Hall) - Gowanda, New York - U.S. National Register of Historic Places on Waymarking.com
Historical marker/historic landmark for Bank of Gowanda in Gowanda, NY

Gowanda, Bank Of
Neoclassical architecture in New York (state)
Commercial buildings completed in 1914
Buildings and structures in Cattaraugus County, New York
National Register of Historic Places in Cattaraugus County, New York